Rodney Liber is an American producer of theatrical release feature films.  Over his twenty-year career, he has been involved in the production of over forty motion pictures.  His latest, The Back-up Plan, stars Jennifer Lopez and Alex O'Loughlin.  Previously, Liber worked on two fantasy adventure films, Dragonball Evolution and The Vampire's Assistant.  He has been a frequent collaborator with Paul Weitz, on both In Good Company and American Dreamz.  He produced two breakout hits, Big Momma's House starring Martin Lawrence and the sexual thriller, Wild Things.

While a vice president of production at 20th Century Fox, Liber supervised the production of classic comedies My Cousin Vinny and Hot Shots!.  He also collaborated with Michael Mann on the Academy Award-winning movie, The Last of the Mohicans.   Liber began his career working as a production assistant for fellow USC alum and Avatar producer Jon Landau (film producer).

Liber retired from producing films in 2010 to pursue his interest in real estate development and spend more time with family and friends.

Liber is the son of Sol Liber (1923-2018), a resistance fighter in the Warsaw Ghetto Uprising of 1943 and a survivor of three concentration camps (Treblinka, Majdanek and Buchenwald.) Liber's father was one of the initial survivors to record their testimony with Steven Spielberg's Shoah Foundation.

References

External links
 

Living people
Film producers from California
People from Los Angeles
University of Southern California alumni
Year of birth missing (living people)